The Niers is a river in Germany and The Netherlands, a right tributary of the river Maas (Meuse). Its wellspring is near Erkelenz, south of Mönchengladbach, in North Rhine-Westphalia (Germany).

Course and length

The Niers flows through Mönchengladbach, Viersen, Wachtendonk, Geldern and Goch before flowing into the Meuse just across the border with the Netherlands, in Gennep, Limburg (Netherlands).

Its overall length is 116 km - 108 km in Germany, 8 km in the Netherlands.

See also

 List of rivers of North Rhine-Westphalia
 Meuse#Tributaries

References

External links 
 Niers
 Niersverband

 
Rivers of Limburg (Netherlands)
Rivers of North Rhine-Westphalia
Rivers of the Netherlands
Gennep
Rivers of Germany
International rivers of Europe